The Culebra Cut, formerly called Gaillard Cut, is an artificial valley that cuts through the Continental Divide in Panama. The cut forms part of the Panama Canal, linking Gatun Lake, and thereby the Atlantic Ocean, to the Gulf of Panama and hence the Pacific Ocean.

Construction of the cut was one of the great engineering feats of its time; the immense effort required to complete it was justified by the great significance of the canal to shipping, and in particular the strategic interests of the United States of America.

Culebra is the name for the mountain ridge it cuts through, and was also originally applied to the cut itself. From 1915 to 2000 the cut was named Gaillard Cut after US Major David du Bose Gaillard, who had led the excavation. After the canal handover to Panama in 2000, the name was changed back to Culebra. In Spanish the cut is known as the Corte Culebra and is also called the Snake Cut.

Construction

French work

Digging at Culebra began on January 22, 1881. A combination of disease, underestimation of the problem, and financial difficulties led to the collapse of the French effort, which was bought out by the United States in 1904.

American work

The United States took over on May 4, 1904. A vast amount of new earthmoving equipment was imported, and a comprehensive system of railways was constructed for the removal of the immense amounts of earthen and rocky spoil.

Major David du Bose Gaillard, of the U.S. Army Corps of Engineers, joined the project at the same time as Goethals, and he was put in charge of the central district of the canal, which was responsible for all of the work between Gatun Lake and the Pedro Miguel locks—most notably, the Culebra Cut. Gaillard brought dedication and quiet, clear-sighted leadership to his difficult, complex task.

The scale of the work was massive. Elaborate (multiple) air compressor facilities using some 30 miles of pipe powered hundreds of compressed air drills to bore holes for 400,000 pounds of dynamite per month to blast and fragment the rock of the cut so that it could be excavated by steam shovels, most made by Bucyrus Foundry and Manufacturing Company of Milwaukee. In a typical day, 160 trainloads of material were hauled away from a cut . This workload on the railroads required some skillful co-ordination. At the busiest times, there was a train going inbound or outbound almost every minute.

Six thousand men worked in the cut, drilling holes, placing explosives, controlling steam shovels, and running the dirt trains. They also moved and extended the railroad tracks as the work moved forward. Twice a day work stopped for blasting, and then the steam shovels were moved in to take the loose spoil (dirt and rock) away. More than 600 holes filled with dynamite were fired daily. In all,  of dynamite were used.

Landslides

The excavation of the cut was one of the greatest areas of uncertainty in the creation of the canal, due to the unpredicted large landslides. The misjudgment was in part due to unforeseen oxidation of the underlying iron strata due to water infiltration, which caused weakening and eventually a collapse of the strata. Strain softening of the underlying shale layers of sedimentary units caused continuation of sliding as the strength of the slide post-failure was reduced.

The first and largest major slide occurred in 1907 at Cucaracha. This slide caused many people to suggest the construction of the Panama Canal would be impossible; Gaillard described the slides as tropical glaciers, made of mud instead of ice. The clay was too soft to be excavated by the steam shovels, and it was therefore largely removed by sluicing it with water from a high level.

After this, the sediment in the upper levels of the cut were removed, resulting in less weight over the weak strata. Landslides continued to be a problem after the canal's opening, causing intermittent closures.

Completion

Steam shovels broke through the Culebra Cut on May 20, 1913. Some  of this material was additional to the planned excavation, having been brought into the cut by the landslides.

Gaillard was promoted to colonel in 1913. One month later, on December 5, he died of a brain tumor in Baltimore, Maryland, and hence he did not live to see the opening of the canal in 1914. The Culebra Cut, as it was originally known, was renamed to the Gaillard Cut on April 27, 1915, in his honor. After the handing over of the canal to Panama in 2000, the old name Culebra Cut was reinstated.

See also
 Postage stamps and postal history of the Canal Zone
 Earthworks (engineering)

References

Further reading
Making the Dirt Fly, Building the Panama Canal, Smithsonian Institution Libraries, USA.
Ira E. Bennett, History Of The Panama Canal.
TR's Legacy — The Panama Canal , PBS, USA.

External links

Photos of the Culebra Cut in the Panama Stereographs Collection
Image of the Cucaracha Slide

Cuts (earthmoving)
Panama Canal
1913 establishments in Panama